This List of Jews contains individuals who, in accordance with Wikipedia's verifiability and no original research policies, have been identified as Jews by reliable sources.
The following is a list of Jews born in the territory of the former Russian Empire. It is geographically defined, so it also includes people born after the dissolution of the Russian Empire in 1922 and its successor the Soviet Union in 1991.

A few years before the Holocaust, the Jewish population of the Soviet Union (excluding Western Ukraine and the Baltic states that were not part of the Soviet Union then) stood at over 5 million, most of whom were Ashkenazic as opposed to Sephardic, with some Karaite minorities. It is estimated that more than half died directly as a result of the Holocaust.

Politics and military

Politicians
 Georgy Arbatov, Soviet politician, academic and political advisor
 Aizik Aronchik, attempted to assassinate the Tsar Alexander II
 Dimitri Bogrov, Soviet politician
 Anatoly Chubais, Deputy Prime Minister, now Chairman of UES
 Mikhail Fradkov, Prime Minister (half-Jewish)
 Volodymyr Groysman, Prime Minister of Ukraine (2016-2019)
 Adolph Joffe, Bolshevik diplomat
 Lazar Kaganovich, First Deputy Premier of the Soviet Union and one of the principal architects of the Ukrainian famine.
 Lev Kamenev, Bolshevik leader (Jewish father)
 Maxim Litvinov, Soviet ambassador and Minister of Foreign Affairs
 Julius Martov, Menshevik leader
Mikhail Mishustin, incumbent Prime Minister
 Boris Nemtsov, Deputy Prime Minister
 Yevgeny Primakov, Russian politician and diplomat who served as Prime Minister of Russia from 1998 to 1999. 
 Karl Radek, Soviet politician
 Yevgeny Roizman, deputy of the Russian State Duma, mayor of Yekaterinburg (Jewish father)
 Grigory Sokolnikov, Bolshevik politician
 Yakov Sverdlov, Bolshevik leader, the first head of state of the Russian SFSR
 Leon Trotsky, Bolshevik politician, the founder of the Red Army
 Moisei Uritsky, Soviet politician
Leonid Volkov, Russian opposition leader. Alexei Navalny's campaign manager and technical director
 Genrikh Yagoda, head of Secret Police in the Stalin era (1934–1936)
 Yakov Yurovsky, Bolshevik commander, was in charge of imprisonment and execution of Tsar Nicolas II of Russia and his family (under Vladimir Lenin's orders)
 Volodymyr Zelenskyy, incumbent President of Ukraine
 Grigory Zinoviev, Soviet politician
 Vladimir Zhirinovsky, Russian politician; leader of the Liberal Democratic Party of Russia (LDPR); Vice-chairman of the State Duma; member of the Parliamentary Assembly of the Council of Europe"

Israeli politicians
 Menachem Begin, Israeli Prime Minister, Nobel Prize (1978)
 Yitzhak Ben-Zvi, second President of Israel (1952–63)
 Shmuel Dayan, Zionist activist, Israeli politician
 Levi Eshkol, Israeli Prime Minister (1963–69)
 Ephraim Katzir, fourth President of Israel (1973–78)
 Avigdor Lieberman, Israeli Deputy Prime Minister and Minister of Strategic Affairs (2006–2008)
 Golda Meir, Israeli Prime Minister (1969–74)
 Yitzhak Shamir, Israeli Prime Minister (1983–84, 1986–92)
 Natan Sharansky, Israeli politician
 Moshe Sharett, Israeli Prime Minister (1954–55)
 Zalman Shazar, third President of Israel (1963–73)
 Chaim Weizmann, first President of Israel (1949–52)

Israeli military persons
 Yaakov Dori, first Chief of Staff of the Israel Defense Forces (IDF) (1948–1949); President of Technion.
 Ze'ev Jabotinsky, founder of British Jewish Legion
 Haim Laskov, fifth Chief of Staff of the Israel Defense Forces (1958–1961)
 Yitzhak Sadeh, Palmach commander and one of the IDF founders
 Joseph Trumpeldor, founder of British Jewish Legion and early pioneer-settler in Israel (born in Pyatigorsk)
 Tzvi Tzur, sixth Chief of Staff of the Israel Defense Forces (1961–1964)

Soviet soldiers and revolutionaries
 Osip Aptekman, revolutionary
 Pavel Axelrod, Menshevik, Marxist revolutionary
 Yevno Azef, revolutionary
 Tuvia Bielski, Belarusian partisan
 Yakov Blumkin, Soviet spy
 Ivan Chernyakhovsky, Soviet Front Commander, WWII
 Fedor Dan, revolutionary
 Leo Deutsch, revolutionary
 David Dragunsky, Soviet tank brigade commander, WWII
 Raya Dunayevskaya, founder of Marxist humanism in the U.S.
 Hesya Helfman, revolutionary
 Grigory Gershuni, revolutionary
 Moshe Gildenman, known as Dyadya ("Uncle") Misha, partisan commander
 Grigory Goldenberg, revolutionary
 Olga Kameneva, Russian Bolshevik revolutionary and a Soviet politician (sister of Leon Trotsky)
 Walter Krivitsky, Soviet spy
 Semyon Krivoshein, Soviet mechanized corps commander, WWII

 Rodion Malinovsky, Soviet front commander, WWII, Minister of Defence (Jewish origin is disputed)
 Mark Natanson, revolutionary
 Alexander Parvus, revolutionary
 Grigoriy Plaskov, Soviet artillery lieutenant
 Sidney Reilly (born Shlomo Rosenblum), Ukrainian-born adventurer and Secret Intelligence Service agent
 Theodore Rothstein, Russian-British communist
 Pinhas Rutenberg, Zionist, Social revolutionary
 Israel and Manya Shochat, founders of the Hashomer movement
 Moisei Uritsky, communist revolutionary
 Volin (Vsevolod Eikhenbaum), leading Russian Anarchist. Senior member of Nestor Makhno's movement (1918-1921)
 V. Volodarsky, communist revolutionary
 Iona Yakir, Red Army commander and one of the world's major military reformers between World War I and World War II

Others
 Murray Bookchin, important American anarchist
 Michael Dorfman, Russian-Israeli essayist and human rights activist
 David Dubinsky, American labor leader
 Yisroel ben Eliezer (The Baal Shem Tov), rabbi, founder of Hasidic Judaism
 Natasha Epstein, beauty queen; graduate of Harvard University
 Shlomo Ganzfried, rabbi
 Fanny Kaplan, would-be assassin of Lenin
 Menachem Mendel Schneerson, Rebbe of the Chabad-Lubavitch branch of Hasidic Judaism
 Dov Sudak, rabbi of Krijopol before the war
 Boris Volynov, Soviet astronaut; the first Jew in space (Jewish mother)

Business figures

 Roman Abramovich, businessman, owner of Chelsea F.C.
 Pyotr Aven, businessman
 Leon Bagrit, pioneer of automation
 Bernhard Baron, cigarette maker and philanthropist
 Boris Berezovsky, businessman, politician
 Zino Davidoff (born Sussele-Meier Davidoff), former tobacco manufacturer, known as "King of Cigars"
 Bernard Delfont, impresario
 Mikhail Fridman, businessman
 Arcadi Gaydamak, owner of Portsmouth F.C., AJ Auxerre, and Bnei Sakhnin F.C.
 Leslie Grade, executive
 Lew Grade, impresario, Chairman of ATV from 1962
 Vladimir Gusinsky, exile, former media tycoon
 Boris Khait, businessman and vice-president of the Russian Jewish Congress
 German Khan, businessman
 Mikhail Khodorkovsky, businessman, politician (Jewish father)
 Ihor Kolomoyskyi, Ukrainian businessman
 Max Levchin (born Maksymilian Levchin), co-founder of PayPal
 Morris Markin, founder of Checker Cab
 Michael Marks, co-founder of Marks & Spencer
 Alexander Mashkevitch, businessman
 Louis B. Mayer, co-founder of Metro-Goldwyn-Mayer (MGM)
 Leonid Mikhelson, businessman, CEO, chairman and major shareholder of the Russian gas company Novatek
 Yuri Milner,  entrepreneur, venture capitalist 
 Boris Mints, co-founder of Otkritie FC Bank
 Vadim Moshkovich, businessman, founder of Rusagro
 Leonid Nevzlin, businessman
 Mikhail Prokhorov, businessman
 Ida Rosenthal, founder of Maidenform Brassieres
 Arkady Rotenberg, businessman, Vladimir Putin's childhoods friend
 Boris Rotenberg, businessman, Vladimir Putin's childhood friend
 David Sarnoff (born Schwirnofsky), former head of RCA
 Viktor Vekselberg, businessman (Jewish father)
 Leo Wainstein, textile industrialist
 Harry, Albert, Sam, and Jack Warner, founders of Warner Bros.

Scientists

Natural scientists
 Anatole Abragam, physicist
 Alexei Alexeyevich Abrikosov, physicist, Nobel Prize (2003)
 Zhores Alferov, physicist, Nobel Prize (2000)
 Aleksander Akhiezer, physicist

 Semen Altshuler, physicist
 Lev Artsimovich, physicist (Jewish mother)
 Gersh Budker, nuclear physicist
 Matvei Bronstein, theoretical physicist

 Ilya Frank, physicist, Nobel Prize (1958)
 Yakov Frenkel, physicist

 Vitaly Ginzburg, physicist, Nobel Prize (2003)

 Emanuel Goldberg (1881–1970), pioneered Microdots and microfilm retrieval technology
 Alexander Gorodnitsky,  geologist and oceanographer, Soviet and Russian bard and poet
 Vladimir Gribov, physicist

 Mikhail Gurevich, co-founder of the Mikoyan Gurevich (MiG) aircraft design bureau
 Waldemar Haffkine, biologist, vaccine against cholera and plague
 Boris Hessen, physicist
 Naum Idelson, astronomer
 Abram Ioffe, nuclear scientist

 Vladimir Keilis-Borok, physicist
 Isaak Khalatnikov, physicist
 Yuli Khariton, physicist

 Semyon Kosberg, engineer
 Lev Landau, physicist, Nobel Prize (1962)
 Grigory Landsberg, physicist
 Semyon Lavochkin, engineer
 Veniamin Levich, electrochemist

 Evgeny Lifshitz, physicist
 Leonid Mandelstam, physicist
 Alexander Migdal, physicist
 Arkady Migdal, physicist

 Lev Pitaevskii, physicist
 Boris Podolsky, physicist
 Alexander Polyakov, physicist
 Isaak Pomeranchuk, physicist

 Grigory Abramovich Shajn, astronomer
 Mikhail Shifman, physicist
 Iosif Shklovsky, astrophysicist, astronomer, biologist
 Alexander Tropsha, chemist

 Vladimir Veksler, physicist
 Alexander Vilenkin, cosmologist

 Selman Waksman, biochemist, Nobel Prize (1952)
Sorojon Yusufova, geologist
 Yakov Zel'dovich, astrophysicist

Mathematicians
 Georgy Adelson-Velsky, mathematician
 Naum Akhiezer, mathematician
 Vladimir Arnold, mathematician
 Grigory Barenblatt, mathematician

 Joseph Bernstein, mathematician

 Alexander Brudno, mathematician
 Chudnovsky brothers, amateur mathematicians
 Vladimir Drinfeld, mathematician, Fields Medal (1990)
 Eugene Dynkin, mathematician
 Paul Sophus Epstein, mathematician
 Felix Gantmacher, mathematician
 Israel Gelfand, mathematician
 Alexander Gelfond, mathematician
 Semyon Aranovich Gershgorin, mathematician
 Victor Kac, mathematician
 David Kazhdan, mathematician
 Aleksandr Khinchin, mathematician
 Mark Krasnoselsky, mathematician
 Mark Krein, mathematician,
 Alexander Kronrod, mathematician
 Yevgeniy Landis, mathematician
 Solomon Lefschetz, mathematician
 Vladimir Levenshtein, mathematician
 Leonid Levin, mathematician, computational complexity theory
 Jacob Levitzki, Ukrainian-Israeli mathematician
 Grigory Margulis, mathematician, Fields Medal (1978)
 David Milman, mathematician
 Hermann Minkowski, mathematician
 Mark Naimark, mathematician
 Grigori Perelman, mathematician
 Vladimir Rokhlin, mathematician
 Jakob Rosanes, mathematician
 Lev Schnirelmann, mathematician
 Zvi Hermann Schapira, mathematician
 Moses Schönfinkel, logician
 Samuil Shatunovsky, mathematician
 Yakov G. Sinai, applied mathematician
 Alexander Tetelbaum, applied mathematician
 Boris Tsirelson, mathematician
 Pavel Urysohn, mathematician
 Boris Weisfeiler, mathematician
 Victor Zalgaller, mathematician
 Oscar Zariski, mathematician
 Efim Zelmanov, mathematician, Fields Medal (1994)

Social scientists and philosophers
 Urie Bronfenbrenner, developmental psychologist
 Solomon Buber, Hebraist
 Ariel Durant, historian
 Boris Eichenbaum, historian
 Mikhail Epstein, literary theorist
 Moshe Feldenkrais, inventor of the Feldenkrais method
 Alexander Gerschenkron, economic historian
 Jean Gottmann, geographer
 Lazar Gulkowitsch, Jewish Studies scholar
 Abraham Harkavy, historian
 Zellig Harris, linguist
 Roman Jakobson, Russian/American linguist
 Naum Krasner, economist
 Leonid Hurwicz, economist, Nobel Prize (2007)
 Simon Kuznets, economist, Nobel Prize (1971)
 Juri Lotman, prominent semiotician and historian of culture
 Seymour Lubetzky, cataloging theorist
 Jacob Marschak, economist
 Alexander Luria, neuropsychologist
 Alexander Nove, economist
 Jacob Rabinow, inventor
 Ayn Rand, philosopher
 Anatol Rapoport, game theorist
 Dietmar Rosenthal, linguist
 Leonid Roshal, pediatrician, negotiator
 Isaak Russman, historian
 Max Seligsohn, Orientalist
 Lev Shestov, philosopher
 Elye Spivak, linguist

Medical scientists and physicians

 Isaac Andreyevich Chatzkin, physician
 Yevsey Gindes, pediatrician
 Gavriil Ilizarov, orthopaedic surgeon
 Isaac Trachtenberg, hygienist

Cultural figures

Fine artists
 Michael Matusevitch (1929–2007), painter
 Eugene Abeshaus, painter
 Meer Akselrod, painter
 Benish Mininberg, painter
 Nathan Altman, painter and stage designer from Vinnytsia
 Boris Anisfeld, painter, theatre
 Mark Antokolsky, sculptor
 Boris Aronson, painter and designer
 Isaak Asknaziy, painter
 Mordechai Avniel, painter
 Léon Bakst, painter and costume designer
 Abraham Berline, painter
 Eugène Berman, painter
 Leonid Berman, painter
 Mikhail Bernshtein, painter
 Isaak Brodskiy, painter
 Marc Chagall, painter from Vitebsk
 Bella Chagall, wife of Marc Chagall
 Joseph Chaikov, sculptor
 Ilya Chashnik, painter
 Nudie Cohn, fashion designer
 Sonia Delaunay, painter
 Robert Falk, painter
 Naum Gabo, sculptor
 Moisei Ginzburg, architect
 Michail Grobman, painter
 Michel Kikoine, painter
 Boris Iofan, architect
 Ilya Kabakov, conceptual artist (Jewish father)
 Komar and Melamid, art-duo
 Jacob Kramer, painter
 Pinchus Kremegne, painter
 , painter
 Morris Lapidus, architect
 Felix Lembersky painter
 Isaac Levitan, painter
 El Lissitzky, designer
 Louise Nevelson, sculptor
 Ernst Neizvestny, sculptor
 Solomon Nikritin, painter
 Jules Olitski, painter
 Leonid Pasternak, painter
 Antoine Pevsner, sculptor
 Issachar Rybak, painter from Yelizavetgrad
 Semion Rotnitsky, painter
 David Shterenberg, painter from Zhitomir
 Chaïm Soutine, painter from Minsk
 Raphael Soyer, American painter
 Alexander Tetelbaum, Russian-American painter
 Israel Tsvaygenbaum, Russian-American painter
 Joseph Tepper, painter
 Vladimir Weisberg, painter
 Josephinne Yaroshevich, painter
 Lazar Yazgur, painter
 Valentin Yudashkin, fashion designer
 Ossip Zadkine, sculptor (Jewish father)
 Saveliy Moiseyevich Zeydenberg, painter

Musicians

Sophia Agranovich, pianist
 Leonid Agutin, singer-songwriter
Joseph Achron, composer
 Modest Altschuler, cellist, conductor, and composer
 Lera Auerbach, composer/pianist
 Vladimir Ashkenazi, pianist (Jewish father)
 Nina Brodskaya, singer
 Yefim Bronfman, pianist
 Simon Barere, pianist
 Rudolf Barshai, conductor
 Dimitri Bashkirow, pianist
 Yuri Bashmet, violist
 Irving Berlin composer and lyricist
 Lazar Berman, pianist
 Mark Bernes, singer and actor
 Matvei Blanter, composer, author of Katyusha
 Shura Cherkassky, pianist
Vladimir Dashkevich, composer, wrote music for Sherlock Holmes and Dr. Watson
 Bella Davidovich, pianist
 Issay Dobrowen, pianist and composer
Larisa Dolina, singer
 Isaak Dunayevsky, composer
 Mischa Elman, violinist
 Mark Ermler, conductor m I
 Anthony Fedorov, singer, American Idol finalist
 Samuil Feinberg, composer
 Mikhaïl Faerman, pianist
 Vladimir Feltsman, pianist
 Veniamin Fleishman, composer
 Yakov Flier, pianist
 Yan Frenkel, composer
 Grigory Frid, songwriter
 Artur Friedheim, composer
 Kirill Gerstein, pianist
 Josef Gingold (1909–1995) violinist
 Grigory Ginsburg, pianist
 Emil Gilels, pianist
 Grigory Ginzburg, conductor
 Mark Gorenstein, conductor
 Riva Gorohovskaya, pianist
 Emil Gorovets, singer
 Maria Grinberg, pianist
 Natalia Gutman, cellist
Tamara Gverdtsiteli, singer
 Jascha Heifetz, violinist
 Mordechai Hershman, chazzan
 Jascha Horenstein, conductor
 Vladimir Horowitz, pianist
 Aleksey Igudesman, violinist
 Oleg Kagan, violinist
 Ilya Kaler, violinist
 Tina Karol, singer
 Boris Khaykin, conductor
 Evgeny Kissin, pianist
 Alexander Knaifel, composer
Joseph Kobzon, singer
 Leonid Kogan, violinist
 Mikhail Kopelman, violinist
 Yakov Kreizberg, conductor
 Maya Kristalinskaya, singer
Igor Krutoy, composer, pianist
 Josef Lhévinne, pianist
 Alexander Lokshin, composer (Jewish father)
 Arthur Lourié, composer
Andrey Makarevich, singer-songwriter
 Oleg Maisenberg, pianist
 Samuel Maykapar, composer/pianist
 Nathan Milstein, violinist
Lolita Milyavskaya, singer (Jewish father)
 Shlomo Mintz, violinist
 Boris Moiseev, dancer, showmaker
 Benno Moiseiwitsch, pianist
 Larisa Mondrus, singer
 Alexander Mordukhovich, composer
 Vadim Mulerman, singer
 David Oistrakh, violinist
 Igor Oistrakh, violinist (Jewish father)
 Leo Ornstein, composer
 Gregor Piatigorsky, cellist
 Pokrass brothers, composers
 Mikhael Rauchverger, pianist and composer
Viktor Reznikov, composer, singer
 Alexander Rosenbaum, singer-songwriter
 Anton Rubinstein, pianist/composer
 Nikolai Rubinstein, pianist/composer
 Samuil Samosud, conductor
 Alfred Schnittke, composer (Jewish father)
 Eduard Schmieder, conductor
 Joseph Schillinger, composer, music theorist, and composition teacher
Vladimir Shainsky, composer
 Daniil Shafran, cellist
Mihail Shufutinskiy, singer, music producer
 Leo Sirota, pianist
 Regina Spektor, singer-songwriter and pianist
 Isaac Stern, violinist
Yevgeny Sudbin, pianist
Mikhail Tanich, songwriter
 Alexander Tsfasman, jazz pianist, composer, conductor, arranger
 Sophie Tucker, singer
Lyubov Uspenskaya, singer
 Leonid Utyosov, singer and actor
 Anzhelika Varum, singer Aida Vedishcheva, singer
 Maxim Vengerov, violinist
 Alexander Veprik, composer
 Maria Yudina, pianist
 Yakov Zak, pianist
 Inna Zhvanetskaya, composer
 Efrem Zimbalist, Russian-born American violinist

Performing artists
 Jacob Adler, actor
 Anatoly Adoskin, actor (Jewish father)
 Alexander Alov, film director and screenwriter
 Lev Arnshtam, film director
 Dmitry Astrakhan, film director and actor
 Abram Avdalimov, stage actor and theatre director
 Leonid Bronevoy, actor
 Elina Bystritskaya, actress
 Grigori Chukhrai, film director and screenwriter, father of Pavel Chukhrai
 Pavel Chukhrai, film director and screenwriter, son of Grigori Chukhrai
 Maya Deren, filmmaker
 Lev Dodin, theater director
 Mark Donskoi, film director
 Aleksandr Druz, longest-running contestant on the What? Where? When? game show. "Magister of the Game"
 Boris Efimov, cartoonist
 Sergei Eisenstein, film director (Jewish father)
 Fridrikh Ermler, film director, actor, and screenwriter
 Vladimir Etush, actor
 Semyon Farada, actor
 Aleksandr Faintsimmer, cinematographer
 Maxim Galkin, comedian
 Valentin Gaft, actor
 Oleg Gazmanov, singer
 Zinovy Gerdt, actor
 Aleksei German, cinematographer
 Vitaliy Ginzburg, director
 Alexander Goldstein, director
 Abraham Goldfaden (1840–1908), playwright and theatre director
 Yuli Gusman, director
 Alexander Gutman, director
 Roman Izyaev, stage actor and theatre director
 Roman Abelevich Kachanov, animator
 Aleksei Kapler, film artist
 Roman Karmen, documentary filmmaker
 Roman Kartsev, comedian
 Boris Kaufman, cinematographer
 Mikhail Kaufman, cinematographer* Yevgeny Khaldei, photographer
 Gennady Khazanov, comedian
 Iosif Kheifits, film director
 Yefim Kopelyan, actor
 Mikhail Kozakov, actor
 Grigori Kozintsev, theater and film director
 Savely Kramarov, actor
 Mila Kunis, actress
 Yuri Levitan, radio announcer 
 Anatole Litvak, director
 Solomon Mikhoels, actor and director
 Lew Milinder, actor
 Andrei Mironov, actor and singer, Jewish father
 Alexander Mitta, film director
 Alla Nazimova, actress
 Vladimir Naumov, director
 Yuri Norstein, animator
 Klara Novikova (born Herzer), comedian
 Maya Plisetskaya, ballerina
 Iosif Prut, playwright
 Yuli Raizman, film director and screenwriter
 Elena Ralph, model
 Faina Ranevskaya, actress
 Arkady Raikin, comedian
 Konstantin Raikin, actor and theatre director
 Mikhail Romm, film director, scriptwriter, and educator (Jewish father)
 Abram Room, film director
 Grigori Roshal, film director and screenwriter
 Hanna Rovina, actress
 Ida Rubinstein, dancer
Lev Shekhtman, theater director and actor
 Alexander Schirwindt,  actor, director and screenwriter
 Mikhail Schweitzer, screenwriter
 Yefim Shifrin, comedian
 Viktor Shenderovich, humorist
 Esfir Shub, editor, director, and writer of documentary films
 Yakov Smirnoff, American comedian
 Lee Strasberg, acting teacher
 Genndy Tartakovsky, Russian-born American animation director
 Leonid Trauberg, film director, scriptwriter, and educator
 Ivan Urgant, actor, comedian, host of the Evening Urgant television show
 Dziga Vertov, documentary film director and film theoretician
 Vladimir Vinokur, comedian (Jewish father)
 Leonid Yakubovich, actor, host of the Pole Chudes television show
 Leonid Yarmolnik, actor
 Anton Yelchin, Russian-born American film/television actor
 Sergei Yursky, actor
 Sergei Yutkevich, film director and screenwriter

Writers and poets
 Grigory Adamov, writer
 M. Ageyev, novelist
 David Aizman, writer and playwright
 Vasily Aksyonov, writer (Jewish mother)
 Sholom Aleichem, Yiddish-language writer
 Semyon Altov (born Altshuller), writer, comedian
 Isaac Asimov, science fiction writer
 Daniil Atnilov, poet
 Hizgil Avshalumov, novelist, poet and playwright
 Isaac Babel, writer
 Eduard Bagritsky, poet
 Grigory Baklanov, novelist
 Mishi Bakhshiev, writer and poet
 Agniya Barto, writer
 Eliezer Ben-Yehuda, Hebrew-language writer
 Isaac Dov Berkowitz, writer
 Hayyim Nahman Bialik, poet
 Rachel Bluwstein, poet
 Yosef Haim Brenner, Hebrew-language writer
 Osip Brik, author
 Joseph Brodsky, Russian-language poet, Nobel Prize (1987)
 Sasha Cherny, poet
 Korney Chukovsky, writer (Jewish father)
 Manuvakh Dadashev, poet
 Yuli Daniel, writer
 Michael Dorfman, journalist and essayist
 Sergei Dovlatov, journalist and writer (Jewish father)
 David Edelstadt, Yiddish-language anarchist poet
 Ilya Ehrenburg, writer
 Natan Eidelman, writer
 Alter Esselin, poet, carpenter
 Alexander Galich, playwright poet
 Vladimir Galperin, journalist and writer, literature professor
 Boris Gavrilov, poet
 Mikhail Gavrilov, writer and poet
 Aleksandr Gelman, playwright
 Asher Hirsch Ginsberg (Ahad Ha'Am), Hebrew-language writer
 Lydia Ginzburg, writer
 Yevgenia Ginzburg, writer
 Jacob Gordin, American playwright
 Leon Gordon, writer
 Grigori Gorin, playwright and writer
 Vasily Grossman, writer
 Igor Guberman, writer
 Peretz Hirshbein, playwright
 Ilya Ilf, writer
 Vera Inber, poet
 Sergey Izgiyayev, poet
 Lev Kassil, writer
 Veniamin Kaverin, writer (Jewish father)
 Arkady Khait, satirist and playwright
 A.M. Klein, poet
 Pavel Kogan, poet
 Lev Kopelev, author and dissident
 Arkady Kotz, poet
 Lazar Lagin, writer
 Vladimir Lantsberg, writer
 H. Leivick, dramatist
 Clarice Lispector, writer that settled in Brazil fleeing from Ukraine Civil's War
 Benedikt Livshits, writer
 Nadezhda Mandelstam, writer
 Osip Mandelstam, poet
 Samuil Marshak, poet
 Yunna Morits, poet
 Semen Nadson, poet (Jewish father)
 Seva Novgorodsev, musician and journalist (Jewish father)
 Grigoriy Oster, author and scriptwriter
 Yeremey Parnov, writer
 Boris Pasternak, writer, Nobel Prize (1958)
 Yakov Perelman, writer
 Elizaveta Polonskaya, translator, poet
 Vladimir Posner, writer
 David Pinski, writer
 Lev Razgon, writer, gulag inmate for 17 years
 Yevgeny Rein, poet
 Ayn Rand, writer (born Alisa Rosenbaum)
 Ilya Reznik, poet and songwriter
 Anatoli Rybakov, writer
 David Samoylov, poet
 Genrikh Sapgir, poet
 Natalya Sats, playwright (Jewish father)
 Zoya Semenduyeva, poet
 Mendele Mocher Sforim, founder of modern Yiddish and modern Hebrew literature
 Viktor Shklovsky, writer and critic (Jewish father)
 Ilia Shtemler, writer
 Gary Shteyngart (Steinhart), writer
 Yulian Semyonov, writer
 Elena Shirman, poet
 Boris Slutsky, war-time poet
 Mikhail Slonimsky, writer (Jewish father)
 Boris and Arkady Strugatsky, science fiction writers (Jewish father)
 Mikhail Svetlov, poet
 Shaul Tchernichovsky, poet and translator
 Yuri Tynyanov, writer
 Vladimir Voinovich, writer
 Vladimir Vysotsky, poet, singer, actor (Jewish father)
 Semen Yushkevich, writer and playwright
 Boris Zakhoder, children's poet and writer
 Mikhail Zhvanetsky, writer and comedian
 Zinovy Zinik, writer
 Valentin Zorin, Soviet and Russian political commentator, journalist, author, screenwriter and television presenter.

Religious figures
 Israel Isaac Kahanovitch, Orthodox Jewish rabbi
 Raïssa Maritain, Catholic writer and philosopher
 Alexander Men, Russian Orthodox priest, theologian, Biblical scholar and writer.
 Samuel Isaac Joseph Schereschewsky, Anglican Bishop of Shanghai, China, from 1877 to 1884

Sport figures

Chess
 Lev Alburt
 Yuri Averbakh
 Alexander Beliavsky
 Ossip Bernstein
 Benjamin Blumenfeld
 Isaac Boleslavsky
 Mikhail Botvinnik, World Champion
 David Bronstein, World Championship challenger
 Mikhail Tal
 Maxim Dlugy
 Iossif Dorfman
 Mark Dvoretsky
 Louis Eisenberg
 Yakov Estrin
 Alexander Evensohn
 Salo Flohr
 Semen Furman
 Boris Gelfand
 Efim Geller
 Eduard Gufeld
 Boris Gulko
 Dmitry Gurevich
 Ilya Gurevich
 Mikhail Gurevich
 Nicolai Jasnogrodsky
 Gregory Kaidanov
 Ilya Kan
 Garry Kasparov, World Champion
 Alexander Khalifman, FIDE World Champion
 Alexander Konstantinopolsky
 Viktor Korchnoi, World Championship challenger
 Ljuba Kristol
 Alla Kushnir, Women's World Championship challenger
 Anatoly Lein
 Konstantin Lerner
 Grigory Levenfish
 Irina Levitina
 Vladimir Liberzon
 Andor Lilienthal
 Moishe Lowtzky
 Vladimir Malaniuk
 Sam Palatnik
 Ernest Pogosyants
 Iosif Pogrebyssky
 Lev Polugaevsky
 Lev Psakhis
 Abram Rabinovich
 Ilya Rabinovich
 Leonid Shamkovich
 Ilya Smirin
 Gennadi Sosonko
 Leonid Stein
 Peter Svidler
 Mark Taimanov
 Boris Verlinsky
 Yakov Vilner
 Leonid Yudasin

Boxing

 Yuri Foreman, Belarusian-born Israeli US middleweight and World Boxing Association champion super welterweight
 Louis Kaplan ("Kid Kaplan"), Russian-born US, world champion featherweight, Hall of Fame
 Shamil Sabirov, Russia, Olympic champion light flyweight

Canoeing

 Leonid Geishtor, USSR (Belarus), sprint canoer, Olympic champion (Canadian pairs 1,000-meter)
 Michael Kolganov, Soviet (Uzbek)-born Israeli, sprint canoer, world champion, Olympic bronze (K-1 500-meter)
 Naum Prokupets, Moldovan-born Soviet, sprint canoer, Olympic bronze (C-2 1,000-meter), gold (C-2 10,000-meter) at ICF Canoe Sprint World Championships

Fencing

 Yury Gelman (born 1955), Ukrainian-born American Olympic fencing coach 
 Vadim Gutzeit, Ukraine (saber), Olympic champion
 Grigory Kriss, Soviet (épée), Olympic champion, 2x silver
 Maria Mazina, Russia (épée), Olympic champion, bronze
 Mark Midler, Soviet (foil), 2x Olympic champion
 Mark Rakita, Soviet (saber), 2x Olympic champion, 2x silver
 Yakov Rylsky, Soviet (saber), Olympic champion
 Sergey Sharikov, Russia (saber), 2x Olympic champion, silver, bronze
 David Tyshler, Soviet (saber), Olympic bronze
 Eduard Vinokurov, Russia (saber), 2x Olympic champion, silver
 Iosif Vitebskiy, Soviet (épée), Olympic silver, 10x national champion

Figure skating

 Ilya Averbukh, Russia, ice dancer, Olympic silver
 Oksana Baiul, Ukraine, figure skater, Olympic gold, world champion
 Alexei Beletski, Ukrainian-born Israeli, ice dancer, Olympian
 Sasha Cohen, figure skater (U.S. National Champion and silver medalist at the 2006 Winter Olympics)
 Aleksandr Gorelik, Soviet, pair skater, Olympic silver, World Championship 2x silver, bronze
 Natalia Gudina, Ukrainian-born Israeli, figure skater, Olympian
 Gennadi Karponossov, Russia, ice dancer and coach, Olympic gold, World Championship 2x gold, silver, 2x bronze
 Michael Shmerkin, Soviet-born Israeli, figure skater
 Irina Slutskaya, Russia, figure skater, Olympic silver, bronze, World Championship 2x gold, 3x silver, bronze
 Maxim Staviski, Russian-born Bulgarian, ice dancer, World Championship gold, silver, bronze
 Alexandra Zaretski, Belarusian-born Israeli, ice dancer, Olympian
 Roman Zaretski, Belarusian-born Israeli, ice dancer, Olympian

Football (American)

 Joe Magidsohn, Russia, halfback
 Igor Olshansky, Ukraine, defensive lineman (Miami Dolphins)

Gymnastics

 Evgeny (or Yevgeny) Babich, Soviet, Olympic champion, world and European champion, 2x runner-up
 Yanina Batyrchina, Russia, Olympic silver (rhythmic gymnastics)
 Maria Gorokhovskaya, USSR, Olympic 2x champion (all-around individual exercises, team combined exercises), 5x silver (vault, asymmetrical bars, balance beam, floor exercises, team exercises with portable apparatus)
 Natalia Laschenova, USSR, Olympic champion (team)
 Tatiana Lysenko, Soviet/Ukrainian, 2x Olympic champion (balance beam, team combined exercises), bronze (horse vault)
 Mikhail Perelman, USSR, Olympic champion (team combined exercises)
 Vladimir Portnoi, USSR, Olympic silver (team combined exercises) and bronze (long horse vault)
 Yulia Raskina, Belarus, Olympic silver (rhythmic gymnastics)
 Alexander Shatilov, Uzbekistan/Israel, world bronze (artistic gymnast; floor exercises)
 Yelena Shushunova, USSR, Olympic 2x champion (all-around, team), silver (balance beam), bronze (uneven bars)

Ice hockey

 Max Birbraer, Russian from Kazakhstan; lived and played in Israel; 1st Israeli drafted by NHL team (New Jersey Devils)
 Vitaly Davydov, Soviet, defenseman, 3x Olympic champion, world and European champion 1963–71, runner-up
 Alfred Kuchevsky, Soviet, Olympic champion, bronze
 Yuri Lyapkin, Soviet, defenceman, Olympic champion
 Yuri Moiseev, Soviet, Olympic champion, world champion
 Vladimir Myshkin, Soviet, goaltender, Olympic champion, silver
 Ian Rubin, Ukraine/Australia, Russia national team
 Yevgeni Zimin, Soviet, Olympic champion 1968–72, world and European champion 1968–69, 1971
 Viktor Zinger, Soviet, Olympic champion; world champion 1965–69

Judo

 Ārons Bogoļubovs, USSR, Olympic bronze (lightweight)

Rugby league

 Ian Rubin, Ukraine/Australia, Russia national team

Sailing

 Valentyn Mankin, Soviet/Ukraine, only sailor in Olympic history to win gold medals in three different classes (yachting: finn class, tempest class, and star class), silver (yachting, tempest class)

Shooting

 Lev Vainshtein, USSR (Russia), 3x team world champion (25 m and 50 m pistol) and Olympic bronze medalist (300 m rifle)

Soccer (association football)

 Leonid Buryak, USSR/Ukraine, midfielder, Olympic bronze
 Yakov Ehrlich, Russia, striker
 Andriy Oberemko, Ukraine, midfielder (Illichivets and U21 national team)
 Israel Olshanetsky, USSR, attacking midfielder at Dynamo Leningrad
 Boris Razinsky, USSR/Russia, goalkeeper/striker, Olympic champion, manager
 Boris Borisovich Rotenberg, Russia/Finland/Israel, defender
 Mordechai Spiegler, Soviet Union/Israel, striker (Israel national team), manager

Speed skating

 Rafayel Grach, USSR, Olympic silver (500-meter), bronze (500-meter)

Swimming

 Vadim Alexeev, Kazakhstan-born Israeli, breaststroke
 Semyon Belits-Geiman, USSR, Olympic silver (400-m freestyle relay) and bronze (800-m freestyle relay); world record in men's 800-m freestyle
 Lenny Krayzelburg, Ukrainian-born US, 4x Olympic champion (100-m backstroke, 200-m backstroke, twice 4x100-m medley relay); 3x world champion (100-m and 200-m backstroke, 4×100-m medley) and 2x silver (4×100-m medley, 50-m backstroke); 3 world records (50-, 100-, and 200-m backstroke)

Table tennis

 Marina Kravchenko, Ukrainian-born Israeli, Soviet and Israel national teams

Tennis

Anna Smashnova (born 1976), Belarus-born Israeli tennis player

Track and field
 Aleksandr Averbukh, Russian-born Israeli, 2002 and 2006 European champion (pole vault)
 Maria Leontyavna Itkina, USSR, sprinter, world records (400-m & 220-yards, and 800-m relay)
 Svetlana Krachevskaya, USSR, shot put, Olympic silver
 Vera Krepkina, USSR, Olympic champion (long jump), world records (100-m dash and 4x100-m)
 Faina Melnik, Ukrainian-born USSR, 11 world records; Olympic discus throw champion
 Zhanna Pintusevich-Block, Ukraine, sprinter, world 100-m and 200-m champion
 Irina Press, USSR, 2x Olympic champion (80-m hurdles and pentathlon)
 Tamara Press, USSR, 6 world records (shot put and discus); 3x Olympic champion (2x shot put and discus) and silver (discus)

Volleyball

 Nelly Abramova, USSR, Olympic silver
 Larisa Bergen, USSR, Olympic silver
 Yefim Chulak, USSR, Olympic silver, bronze
 Nataliya Kushnir, USSR, Olympic silver
 Yevgeny Lapinsky, USSR, Olympic champion, bronze
 Georgy Mondzolevsky, USSR, 2x Olympic champion, 2x world champion
 Vladimir Patkin, USSR, Olympic silver, bronze
 Yuriy Venherovsky, USSR, Olympic champion

Water polo

 Boris Goikhman, USSR, goalkeeper, Olympic silver, bronze
 Nikolai Melnikov, USSR, Olympic champion

Weightlifting

 Moisei Kas’ianik, Ukrainian-born USSR, world champion
 Grigory Novak, Soviet, Olympic silver (middle-heavyweight); world champion
 Rudolf Plyukfelder, Soviet, Olympic champion, 2x world champion (light heavyweight)
 David Rigert, Kazakh-born USSR, Olympic champion, 5x world champion (light-heavyweight and heavyweight), 68 world records
 Igor Rybak, Ukrainian-born USSR, Olympic champion (lightweight)
 Valery Shary, Byelorussian-born USSR, Olympic champion (light-heavyweight)

Wrestling

 Grigorii Gamarnik, USSR, world champion (Greco-Roman lightweight), world championship silver
 Samuel Gerson, Ukrainian-born US, Olympic silver (freestyle featherweight)
 Boris Maksovich Gurevich, Soviet, Olympic champion (Greco-Roman flyweight), 2x world champion
 Boris Michail Gurevitsch, USSR, Olympic champion (freestyle middleweight), 2x world champion
 Oleg Karavaev, USSR, Olympic champion (Greco-Roman bantamweight), 2x world champion
 Yakov Punkin, Soviet, Olympic champion (Greco-Roman featherweight)
 David Rudman, USSR, world championship bronze

Other sports
 Elena Altshul,  Women's World Draughts Champion
 Nissim Cahn, twice Bronze Medal for Israel, curling
 Nikolay Epstein, Soviet hockey coach
 Alexander Gomelsky, Soviet basketball coach
 Andriy Oberemko, footballer
 Grigory Surkis, chairman of the Football Federation of Ukraine

See also
 Bukharan Jews
 History of the Jews in Russia and the Soviet Union
 List of Galician Jews
 Lists of Jews
 List of Russians

Footnotes

External links
 Prominent Jews based on the Russian Jewish Encyclopedia

Russian Empire born

 

Russian Empire

Jews, Russian Empire